Beat the Star is an Australian game show, based on the British version, which in turn is based on the German game show Schlag den Raab (Beat Raab). The series is hosted by Daniel MacPherson and produced by Seven Media Group for the Seven Network. A family tries to beat a celebrity in a number of minigames in order to win a jackpot, starting at $50,000.

On 10 September 2010, Seven Network announced that it was removing Beat the Star from its programming schedule after the airing of the second episode. The Seven Network eventually aired the remaining two episodes January 2011.

Format
Every episode features one family member at a time, competing against a celebrity in a number of games. The games include sports-oriented contests such as climbing, motorsport and ice hockey, mind games such as puzzles and numerous other unusual challenges. Winning games can earn the contestant varying numbers of points for the winner and successful contestants win a prize of $50,000. If the celebrity wins, the jackpot rolls over. There are eight challenges in match; the points value for winning each task increments from one to eight.

Episodes
 Indicates that the star won
 Indicates that the challenger won
 Indicates that the result is pending

Series 1

Production
The series is produced by Seven Media Group. Contestant and audience calls were advertised on Network Seven and its digital multi-channel 7Two and in early 2010. Brad Lyons, Head of Production, explained "We have always loved this format and have gathered an amazing bunch of celebrities for our families to battle. To see an 11-year-old kid take on a world champion boxer makes for great viewing." It was announced via a media release Manu Feildel, Ada Nicodemou, Danny Green, Andrew Gaze, Jennifer Hawkins and Layne Beachley were to appear on the show. Amid poor ratings, the show was pulled from Network Seven's line-up after only two episodes aired. The remaining episodes did, however, air over December and January.

Reception

Ratings
The first episode premiered with only 955,000 viewers with a nightly ranking of twelfth and losing its timeslot to Top Gear, The 7.30 Report and Talkin' 'Bout Your Generation The programme failed to live up to other Seven Network game show Minute to Win It, which premiered to 1,130,000 viewers The second episode garnered only 862,000 viewers, losing again to Talkin' 'Bout Your Generation and Top Gear.

References

Seven Network original programming
2010 Australian television series debuts
2010 Australian television series endings
2010s Australian game shows